Vallatud kurvid is a 1959 Soviet Estonian lyrical comedy film directed by Juli Kun and Kaljo Kiisk. In 1961 the remake of this film was done, called Dangerous Curves.

Plot

Cast

 Terje Luik - Vaike and Maret
 Rein Aren - Raivo
 Peeter Šmakov - Heino

References

External links
 
 Vallatud kurvid, entry in Estonian Film Database (EFIS)

1959 films
Estonian comedy films
Estonian-language films